The International Emmy Award for Best Performance by an Actor is an award presented by the International Academy of Television Arts & Sciences (IATAS) dedicated to for male performance from a program originally created for television.

Rules and Regulations 
The International Emmy for Best Actor is awarded to a male performance in a made-for-television fiction program (i.e a telefilm, miniseries, telenovelas, drama series or comedy). Under International Academy rules, only performances from a program entered in the competition are eligible. The same performer can be featured for different productions, as separate submissions. More than one male performance from the same production may also be presented. A performer must appear for at least 10% of the total airtime of the featured episode to be eligible. If the performance is part of a series, only one episode must have its first broadcast within the listed eligibility dates.

History
The first recipient of the International Emmy Award for Best Performance by an Actor was French Thierry Frémont for his role in the telefilm Dans la tête du tueur, a co-production between the TF1 network and GMT Productions and directed by Claude-Michel Rome. British actor Ray Winstone won the following year for his role as Vincent Gallagher in the drama series Vincent, produced by Rebecca Hodgson and John Rushton, and aired on ITV.

In 2007, Dutch Pierre Bokma shares the prize with British actor Jim Broadbent for his performance in the BBC tv drama series The Street. In subsequent years the Emmy was awarded only to British actors: David Suchet won as Robert Maxwell in Maxwell, Ben Whishaw for its role in Criminal Justice, Bob Hoskins for The Street and Christopher Eccleston for Accused.

Argentine Darío Grandinetti won an Emmy in 2012 for his role as Mario in the miniseries Televisión por la inclusión, created by Bernarda Llorente and Claudio Villarruel. In 2013 Sean Bean won an International Emmy for playing a transvestite in BBC One drama series Accused. At the 2014 ceremony, best actor trophy went to Stephen Dillane for his role as Karl Roebuck in The Tunnel.

Dutch actor Maarten Heijmans has won the International Emmy for best actor for his portrayal as actor and singer Ramses Shaffy in the television series Ramses. Oscar-winner Dustin Hoffman was named best actor at the 44th International Emmy Awards in 2016. Kenneth Branagh won the Emmy for Best Actor for his performance in BBC detective drama Wallender. 

In 2018, Danish star Lars Mikkelsen won best performance by an actor for his role in the drama television series Ride Upon the Storm. Famous Turkish actor Haluk Bilginer won the best performance by an actor award for his performance in the TV series Şahsiyet.

The 13-year-old British actor Billy Barratt became the youngest person to win an International Emmy award.

Winners and nominees

2000s

2010s

2020s

Photo Gallery

References

External links
 2013 Emmy Awards
 International Emmy Awards

Actor

Television awards for Best Actor